Mahesh Bhupathi and Fabrice Santoro were the defending champions of the doubles event of the Heineken Open tennis tournament, held in Auckland, New Zealand, but did not participate this year.

Yves Allegro and Michael Kohlmann won in the final 6–4, 7–6(7–4), against Simon Aspelin and Todd Perry.

Seeds

Draw

Draw

References

External links
Draw

2005 Heineken Open
2005 ATP Tour